She Is Love is a 2022 British romantic drama written and directed by Jamie Adams, starring Haley Bennett, Sam Riley and Marisa Abela. 

She Is Love had its world premiere at the BFI London Film Festival on 14 October 2022, and was released in the United Kingdom on 3 February 2023 by Signature Entertainment.

Synopsis
Estranged for more than a decade, a divorced couple Idris (Riley) and Patricia (Bennett) revisit their past whilst stuck together in a Cornish hotel owned by Idris’ current girlfriend Louise (Abela).

Cast
 Haley Bennett as Patricia 
 Sam Riley as Idris 
 Marisa Abela as Louise  
 Craig Russell as Frank
 Rosa Robson as Kate

Production
Principal photography finished in Cornwall in April 2021, with some filming taking place at Tresillian House, St Newlyn East. The film has been said to have been shot in 6 days during lockdown and to have been made in an improvisational style that Adams also deployed on previous pictures such as Black Mountain Poets and Love Spreads.

Release
The film received its world premiere at the 66th BFI London Film Festival on 14 October 2022. It is set to be released theatrically and on digital platforms in the United Kingdom on 3 February 2023 by Signature Entertainment.

Reception
On the review aggregator website Rotten Tomatoes, She is Love holds an approval rating of 30% based on 23 reviews.

Kevin Maher of The Times describes “charming screwball chemistry” between the main actors and “a knock-out” performance from Marisa Abela, adding also that it was “nicely shot”. Laura Venning in Empire described it as “pleasant enough but instantly forgettable.”

References

External links
 

2020s British films
2020s English-language films
2022 romantic drama films
British romantic drama films
Films directed by Jamie Adams
Films shot in Cornwall